Dennis Horner (born February 5, 1988) is an American professional basketball player for Instituto de Córdoba of the Argentine Liga Nacional de Básquet.

Early life and college
Horner grew up in Linwood, New Jersey and attended Holy Spirit High School in Absecon, New Jersey, where he was named the co-press basketball player of the year in 2006. He is an alumnus of the North Carolina State University men's basketball team. In his final season (2009–10), Horner averaged 11.9 points and 4.9 rebounds per game.

Professional
After college, Horner started the 2010–11 season with RBC Verviers-Pepinster but after not appearing in a game for them, he signed a contract in Cyprus for club Omonia BC where he played 13 games averaging 11.6 points in 29.3 minutes. Before the 2011–12 season, he made himself eligible for the NBA Development League draft, where he was picked 47th overall by the Springfield Armor, which was in the process of becoming affiliated solely with the NBA's New Jersey Nets. In December, it was announced Horner was one of three players on the Armor invited to Nets' training camp following the 2011 NBA lockout. At that point he had been averaging 15.0 points, 7.7 rebounds and 1.2 assists for Springfield. On December 23, the Nets announced that Horner had made the team, and would start the season on the Nets' roster. Horner was waived by the Nets on January 18, 2012. Horner then returned to the Springfield Armor.

On March 30, 2012, Horner was re-signed by the Nets on a 10-day contract.

In October 2012, he signed with the Artland Dragons of Germany. He left in November 2012.

On January 3, 2013, Horner was re-acquired by the Springfield Armor. On November 1, 2013, he was re-acquired by the Armor for their 2013 training camp. On February 20, 2014, he was traded to the Bakersfield Jam.

On August 1, 2014, he signed a one-year deal with Artland Dragons, returning for second stint.

References

External links

 NC State Wolfpack bio
 NBA D-League Profile
 Dennis Horner at ESPN.com

1988 births
Living people
American expatriate basketball people in Argentina
American expatriate basketball people in Belgium
American expatriate basketball people in Cyprus
American expatriate basketball people in Germany
American men's basketball players
Artland Dragons players
Basketball players from New Jersey
Holy Spirit High School (New Jersey) alumni
NC State Wolfpack men's basketball players
New Jersey Nets players
Obras Sanitarias basketball players
People from Linwood, New Jersey
Power forwards (basketball)
Sportspeople from Atlantic County, New Jersey
Springfield Armor players
Undrafted National Basketball Association players